In coding theory, group codes are a type of code. Group codes consist of

The remaining  bits are the information bits themselves.

Construction 
Group codes can be constructed by special generator matrices which resemble generator matrices of linear block codes except that the elements of those matrices are endomorphisms of the group instead of symbols from the code's alphabet. For example, considering the generator matrix

the elements of this matrix are  matrices which are endomorphisms. In this scenario, each codeword can be represented as
 

See also 
 Group coded recording (GCR)

References

Further reading 
 
 
 
 
 

Coding theory